The Never Forget Tribute Classic is a college basketball series that began during the 2016–17 season. Four teams will participate in a two-game format. It is held at the Prudential Center in Newark, New Jersey.

The event will partner with the Families of Freedom Scholarship Fund, which helps support the education of children of the victims of the September 11 terrorist attacks.

The 2016 event aired on national television through its partners at CBS Sports.

On April 18, 2022, CBS Sports college basketball insider Jon Rothstein reported that Villanova will play Boston College in the 2022 event to be held on December 10.

Yearly participants

Game results

References

Basketball in Newark, New Jersey
College men's basketball competitions in the United States
College basketball competitions
2016 establishments in New Jersey
Recurring sporting events established in 2016
College sports in New Jersey